Rosalie Wax (born Des Plaines, Illinois 1911- died 1998) was a noted American Anthropologist who during the second world war researched interned Japanese-Americans and later Native Americans. She taught at the University of Chicago, University of Kansas and at Washington University.

Selected publications
 Wax, R. (1971). Doing fieldwork: Warnings and advice. University of Chicago Press.
 Wax, Murray, and Rosalie Wax. (1963) "The notion of magic." Current Anthropology 4, no. 5  495-518.
 Wax, R. H., & Thomas, R. K. (1961). American Indians and white people. Phylon. 22(4), 305-317.
 Wax, R. (1952). Field methods and techniques: Reciprocity as a field technique. Human Organization, 11(3), 34-37.
 Wax, R. H. (1979). Gender and age in fieldwork and fieldwork education: No good thing is done by any man alone. Social Problems, 26(5), 509-522.

External links
Rosalie H. Wax Papers, The Bancroft Library

References

1911 births
1998 deaths
University of Chicago faculty
American anthropology writers
American women anthropologists
20th-century American anthropologists
American women academics
University of Kansas faculty
Washington University in St. Louis faculty